The Goltsovoye mine is one of the largest silver mines in Russia and in the world. The mine is located to the southeast of Omsukchan in Omsukchan District, Magadan Oblast, Siberia. The mine has estimated reserves of 46.9 million oz of silver.

References 

Silver mines in Russia
Kolyma Mountains